Tutbury is a civil parish in the district of East Staffordshire, Staffordshire, England.  It contains 35 listed buildings that are recorded in the National Heritage List for England.  Of these, two are listed at Grade I, the highest of the three grades, one is Grade II*, the middle grade, and the others are at Grade II, the lowest grade.  The parish contains the large village of Tutbury and the surrounding countryside.  The most important of the listed buildings are Tutbury Castle and St Mary's Church.  The majority of the listed buildings are in the village, and most of these are houses, cottages and shops.  Also in the village are a hotel, two buildings that originated as chapels, and a telephone kiosk.  Outside the village are farmhouses, a manor house, a mill and a mill house, and a milepost.


Key

Buildings

References

Citations

Sources

Lists of listed buildings in Staffordshire